Heteromyza is a genus of flies in the family Heleomyzidae. There are at least four described species in Heteromyza.

Species
These four species belong to the genus Heteromyza:
Heteromyza atricornis Meigen, 1830 c g
Heteromyza commixta Collin, 1901 c g
Heteromyza oculata Fallén, 1820 i c g b
Heteromyza rotundicornis (Zetterstedt, 1846) c g
Data sources: i = ITIS, c = Catalogue of Life, g = GBIF, b = Bugguide.net

References

Further reading

External links

 

Heleomyzidae
Articles created by Qbugbot
Sphaeroceroidea genera